During the 2001–02 season, Tottenham Hotspur participated in the English Premier League.

Season summary
Glenn Hoddle's return to White Hart Lane as manager was seen by many as the revival of Tottenham after many seasons of mediocrity. Spurs reached the Worthington Cup final with Spurs fans hopeful that Hoddle's comeback would result in instant success. However Blackburn Rovers won 2–1, and Tottenham's silverware bid was over. Unremarkable Premiership form ended their UEFA Cup hopes, and they had to settle for ninth place in the final table.

Season squad
Squad at end of season

Transfers and loans

Released

Transfers out

Loans in

Final league table

Results summary

Results by round

Results
Tottenham Hotspur's score comes first

Legend

FA Premier League

FA Cup

League Cup

Statistics

Appearances and goals

|-
! colspan=14 style=background:#dcdcdc; text-align:center| Goalkeepers

|-
! colspan=14 style=background:#dcdcdc; text-align:center| Defenders

|-
! colspan=14 style=background:#dcdcdc; text-align:center| Midfielders

|-
! colspan=14 style=background:#dcdcdc; text-align:center| Forwards

Goal scorers 

The list is sorted by shirt number when total goals are equal.

Clean sheets

References

Tottenham Hotspur F.C. seasons
Tottenham Hotspur